There are various modes of transportation available in Vizianagaram and its Neighbourhoods. It includes auto rickshaws, bicycles to mass transit systems - such as buses, trains and flights.

Roadways 

The city has a total road length of 317.90 km. Government is planning to construct a 17-km bypass road with Rs 470 crore to ease the traffic in the town. The road between Mayuri Junction and Balaji Junction, with a length of 1.4 km is being extended into six lane. 20-km stretch NH 26 have been developed to ease traffic flow between Vizianagaram and Visakhapatnam. The city is connected to Visakhapatnam (60 km) via NH 43 & NH 5, to Vijayawada (394 km) via NH 5, to Raipur (526 km) via NH 59, to Hyderabad (664 km) via NH 5 & NH9 and to Chennai (416 km) via NH 5 and AH 45.

Public Transport 

By Road

The Andhra Pradesh State Road Transport Corporation operates bus services from Vizianagaram bus station. Viziagaram zone is one of the 4 zones for APS RTC. Cycling is one of the easiest means of transport in the city and is encouraged by government authorities.
 
Train Transit

Vizianagaram railway station is on the Khurda Road-Visakhapatnam section of Howrah-Chennai main line and is the terminus for the Jharsuguda-Vizianagaram line. It has five Platforms. Nellimarla serves as satellite station to the city. It is one of the railway stations that have access to Free Wi-Fi developed by Indian Railways.

Airways

The nearest airport is in Visakhapatnam located at 62 km. During the 2016-17 fiscal year, Visakhapatnam Airport  had served a total of 2,358,029 passengers, an increase of 30.7% from previous year. It handled 19,550 aircraft including 1,421 international and 18,129 domestic.

Seaways

Visakhapatnam Port is the nearest and one of the 13 major seaports in India. The Visakhapatnam Port Trust plans to develop a satellite port at Bheemunipatnam to decongest  traffic at Visakhapatnam. The project is expected to cost 2,000 crores and is to be undertaken through a Public- Private Partnership (PPP)venture. After construction, Bheemili will be the nearest port to the city.

References

Transport in Vizianagaram district
Transport in Andhra Pradesh by city